Dmytro Oleksandrovych Myshnyov (born 26 January 1994) is a Ukrainian professional footballer who plays as a central midfielder for the Ukrainian Premier League club Zorya Luhansk.

Career
He is a product of Mariupol sportive school.

He made his debut for Illichivets Mariupol in the Ukrainian Premier League on 30 November 2013.

On 2022 he signed for Zorya Luhansk.

Honours
Mariupol
 Ukrainian First League: 2016–17

References

External links
 
 

1994 births
Living people
People from Lyman, Ukraine
Ukrainian footballers
Ukraine youth international footballers
Ukraine under-21 international footballers
Association football midfielders
FC Mariupol players
FC Zorya Luhansk players
Ukrainian Premier League players
Ukrainian First League players
Sportspeople from Donetsk Oblast